was the Japanese slang term for districts historically engaged in the sex work industry in Japan, specifically within the time period of January 1946 through to March 1958.

Etymology
The term  literally translates as "red-line". Though similar to another term previously used for red-light districts,  was used as a collective term for red-light districts only between 1946 and 1958, following an issue ordered by GHQ (SCAPIN 642) nationwide to abolish Japan's legalised system of sex work.

Another term, was used for "non-permitted" or "non-legal" sex industry districts. In Tokyo, the area directly across the Sumida river from Yoshiwara (Tamanoi, now called Higashi Mukōjima) was a well-known  district; it features in some of Kafū Nagai's short stories.

The term  is often compared directly with the term "red-light district" in the west. In practice,  and  referred to the colors on municipal zoning maps that outlined brothel districts and "normal" entertainment districts.

History
In January 1946, GHQ issued an order (SCAPIN 642) nationwide to abolish this licensed sex work system. This had a number of impacts on  areas, the largest of which was the  being renamed as  districts. The order also had the effect of disbanding the short-lived Recreation and Amusement Association, which had, for a period of one year, worked to ensure that sex workers were not abused and exploited by stationed American soldiers, amongst other things.

Despite the increased restrictions and the restructuring of the sex work industry, commercial brothels continued to operate within the law, with  districts remaining the designated regions for state-regulated sex work. Due to GHQ orders, brothels - often numbering in their hundreds - began to front non-adult faces of their businesses (such as coffee shops, cafés and beer halls), but would offer sexual services to customers, creating new avenues for the sex industry to continue, especially in popular districts such as Yoshiwara, the  region of Tokyo.

However, following the partial disbanding of traditional red-light areas, formerly law-abiding  sex work businesses began operating within  areas, creating difficulties for the SCAP to identify brothels and continue its "Off Limits" policy.

See also
Prostitution in Japan

Street of Shame Kenji Mizoguchi's 1956 film
Susukino, a well-known red-light district in Sapporo, Hokkaido

References

Red-light districts in Japan
Sexuality in Japan
Prostitution in Japan
Society of Japan
Japanese culture
Japanese words and phrases